Patio del Moro is a historic apartment complex in West Hollywood, California, U.S..

History
The apartment complex was built by Arthur and Nina Zwebell in 1925, and it was designed in the Moorish architectural style. It includes seven maisonette apartments: Villa del Key Moro; La Casita; Casita para una Estrellita; Casa del Sol; Patio del Fuente; Casa del Orienta; and Casa del Alegria.

Past residents include Charlie Chaplin, Paulette Goddard, Joan Fontaine, Humphrey Bogart, Suzanne Pleshette and Joyce Van Patten.

The complex has been listed on the National Register of Historic Places since September 11, 1986.

References

Houses on the National Register of Historic Places in California
Moorish Revival architecture in California
Houses completed in 1925
Houses in Los Angeles County, California